The 1912 North Carolina Tar Heels football team represented the University of North Carolina in the 1912 college football season. The team captain of the 1912 season was Wm. Tillett.

Schedule

References

North Carolina
North Carolina Tar Heels football seasons
North Carolina Tar Heels football